Fox currently airs soccer matches in the United States. These matches are from the FIFA World Cup, the FIFA Women's World Cup, the UEFA European Championship, the Gold Cup, Copa América, MLS, and Liga MX. Fox formerly aired the UEFA Champions League and UEFA Europa League, the Premier League, the Bundesliga, the Serie A, and the FA Cup.

Current contracts

FIFA 
On October 22, 2011, FIFA awarded English-language rights to its tournaments to Fox from 2015 through 2022, including the 2018 and 2022 FIFA World Cup, and the 2015 (which would mark Fox's first professional FIFA tournament broadcast) and 2019 FIFA Women's World Cup, replacing ESPN and ABC. In February 2015, the contract was extended to 2026, in what was reported to be compensation for the re-scheduling of the 2022 World Cup to late-November/mid-December (which conflicts with the regular seasons of most major U.S. leagues, including the NFL) due to the climate of the host country. Fox's coverage could end after the 2026 FIFA World Cup as ESPN is interested in the 2030 FIFA World Cup

UEFA 
Fox replaces ESPN as the new home of the UEFA national tournaments. This six-year agreement will including the next two editions of European Championship as well as the UEFA Nations League, UEFA qualifying competitions, and all friendly matches controlled by UEFA. FuboTV will stream matches via sublicensing from Fox.

CONCACAF 
Fox exclusively airing most of CONCACAF Clubs and Nations Championship until 2022-2025, including Gold Cup, Champions League, and both Men's and Women's Olympic Qualifying tournament.

CONMEBOL 
Fox reached a long-term agreement with CONMEBOL for airing their South American men's and women's soccer tournament, highlighted with Copa América and Copa América Femenina also including World Cup and Olympic qualifiers. This six-year agreement will kick-off this June with 2021 Copa América.

Liga MX

In May 2018, Fox Sports acquired the rights to Tijuana, Monterrey, and Santos home matches. These matches started airing across Fox Sports in late July 2018, with the exception of Santos matches which will begin in 2019. In July 2022, their coverage was expanded with addition of Juárez home matches. Matches are broadcast on FS1, FS2, Fox Deportes, and the Fox Sports regional networks in the Western U.S.

MLS 
Fox aired weekly Major League Soccer (MLS) matches on Sunday afternoons and evenings. Rob Stone hosted in the studio alongside studio analysts Alexi Lalas and Maurice Edu. John Strong and Stuart Holden called the weekly matches from site. (See Major League Soccer on television.) Most of the coverage moved to Apple TV+ after 2022. Fox will still continue to air games as sole linear partner through the 2026 season.

Coupe de France 
Fox acquired the rights to the Coupe de France in 2023 from beIN Sports.

Canadian Premier League
In August 2020, Fox Sports became the first American broadcast partner of the Canadian Premier League.

Former rights

Bundesliga
Fox aired the Bundesliga since 2015 and aired all 306 league games and relegation playoffs via FS1, FS2, and Fox Soccer Plus. The pre-game and halftime show is hosted by Ian Joy or Kate Abdo, and two pundits (rotation). The lead commentator was Keith Costigan. The 2019–20 season was the networks' last broadcasting the Bundesliga as ESPN picked up the rights.

DFL-Supercup
Fox has aired the German DFL-Supercup since 2015 and only airs select tournament matches.

Premier League

Fox Soccer aired the English Premier League from 2000 to 2013. In the later years of their coverage, Fox had a studio pregame show first hosted by Christian Miles until 2011, then by Rob Stone. Studio analysts were Warren Barton, Eric Wynalda, and Keith Costigan. Commentary was provided by former corporate sibling Sky Sports.

FA Cup

Fox previously aired the English FA Cup since 2014, until their rights expired in 2018. ESPN has since acquired these rights. FA Cup coverage was hosted by Rob Stone or Kate Abdo alongside a rotation of analysts including Warren Barton, Alexi Lalas, and Mario Melchiot. Lead world feed broadcast team for FA Cup was Martin Tyler and Stewart Robson.

UEFA Champions League and Europa League

Fox formerly aired the UEFA Champions League and the UEFA Europa League from 2009–18. Rob Stone hosted UEFA Champions League coverage alongside a rotation of analysts including Warren Barton, Brad Friedel, Eric Wynalda, Stuart Holden, and Alexi Lalas. Lead broadcast team for non World-Feed broadcasts of UEFA Champions League from 2013–14 was Gus Johnson and Eric Wynalda, then the World-Feed broadcasts, and finally John Strong and Stuart Holden or Brad Friedel replaced them as lead commentator from 2016–18. Ian Joy or Kate Abdo hosted UEFA Europa League coverage alongside analysts Stuart Holden, Warren Barton, and Mario Melchiot. Lead broadcast team for Europa League coverage was Keith Costigan and Alexi Lalas. For World-Feed broadcasts, Tony Jones and David Pleat call both UEFA Champions League Final and UEFA Europa League Final.

USMNT/USWNT 
Through their MLS deal, Fox shared the right to USMNT and USWNT matches with ESPN/ABC. John Strong and Stuart Holden were the main USMNT commentators with studio coverage hosted by Rob Stone alongside analysts Alexi Lalas and Maurice Edu. USWNT commentators were JP Dellacamera with analyst Aly Wagner and studio coverage was hosted by Rob Stone, Sara Walsh, or Jenny Taft with analysts Leslie Osborne, Heather O'Reilly, Christie Pearce Rampone, and Alexi Lalas. This coverage has ended after 2022 when these rights moved to Turner Sports.

On-air staff

Regular season
Presenters

Studio analysts

Play-by-play announcers

Color commentators

Reporters

Past international coverage and broadcast teams

References

External links
 

American live television series
Fox Sports original programming
Fox Sports
Fox Sports
Fox Sports
Fox Sports
Fox Sports 1 original programming
Fox Soccer original programming
2010s American television series
2020s American television series